Sommar i Sverige is a song written by Christer Lundh and Mikael Wendt. Lyrically describing the coastlines of Sweden during the summertime, the song was recorded by Sven-Ingvars, and released as a single in 1994. and on the album Byns enda blondin the same year.

The song also appeared at Svensktoppen for seven weeks during the period 16 July – 27 August 1994.

In 1996, the song was covered by Lasse Petters. and by Casanovas on the 2013 album Sommar i Sverige.

References 

1994 singles
Sven-Ingvars songs
Swedish-language songs
Songs about Sweden
1994 songs